Blair Feeney (born 9 December 1975) is a rugby union player who plays for Counties Manukau in the 2006 Air New Zealand Cup. He played for Counties Manukau between 1996 and 2001, Otago 2002, Viadana 2003–2004 and Newbury 2004–2005. He was born in Auckland, New Zealand.

References

Living people
1975 births
New Zealand rugby union players
Rugby union fly-halves